Southern Pacific Railroad's AC-6 class of steam locomotives was the third of the railroad's classes built with a 4-8-8-2 wheel arrangement.  Like the earlier AC-4 and AC-5 classes, the AC-6 class were cab forward locomotives.  The AC-6 was slightly larger than the previous classes with a higher boiler pressure and tractive effort rating.

In 1947 and 1948, this class was rebuilt with cast steel frames, increasing the overall weight to 648,000 lb (with 523,600 lb on the drivers).  At this time, most of the locomotives in the class were also equipped with larger cab windows that became standard for SP's cab forward locomotives beginning with the AC-8 class. One of those locomotives that had been turned from AC-6 to AC-8 was the number 4146.

This class was removed from active service between 1954 and 1955 and they were all scrapped by March 1956, with the exception of one located at the California State Railway Museum's main location in Sacramento California.

References 
 

AC-06
4-8-8-2 locomotives
Baldwin locomotives
Simple articulated locomotives
Railway locomotives introduced in 1930
Steam locomotives of the United States
Scrapped locomotives
Standard gauge locomotives of the United States
Cab forward steam locomotives 
Freight locomotives